Graphotype may refer to:

 Graphotype: is a relief printing master made by drawing or painting on a chalk surface with gelatinous ink.
 Graphotype platemaker, is a type of metal marking machine used to create address plates and mark identity tags.